Evolution is a retrospective compilation album by the English rock band Magnum, released by SPV/Steamhammer on 11 November 2011 in Germany and 14 November in the UK and the rest of Europe. The album marks the tenth anniversary of the band since their reformation in 2001, as well as the band's tenth anniversary with SPV GmbH.

The album features material culled from the band's last five releases by SPV in re-recorded, remixed and remastered form, including two new songs.

Track listing

Personnel
Bob Catley — vocals
Tony Clarkin — guitar
Mark Stanway — keyboards
Al Barrow — bass
Harry James — drums

References

External links
 www.magnumonline.co.uk — Official Magnum site

2011 compilation albums
Magnum (band) compilation albums
Albums produced by Tony Clarkin
SPV/Steamhammer compilation albums